The Avondale–Southdown Line is a proposed railway line between Avondale and Southdown in Auckland, New Zealand. One of its main functions would be to remove north–south freight trains from the section of the Auckland rail system that has the most passenger traffic.

Proposals
The Auckland Regional Transport Authority's Rail Development Plan 2006 included the line in its long-term vision for Auckland's rail network, however, there has been little development work on the project, and it may not be completed until 2030.  It is currently envisaged that the line is most likely to be built between 2031 and 2040.

Route 
The line would connect the Western Line just east of Avondale Train Station with the Southern Line at Auckland Freight Centre, Southdown. The reopening in 2010 of the Onehunga Branch to passenger traffic may make it more feasible for the line to connect with that branch in Onehunga township. New Zealand Railways Corporation owns most of the corridor for the line, which follows Oakley Creek and part of the State Highway 20 corridor. The SH20 extension from Hillsborough to Mount Roskill made provision for the line's construction. The line would cross over the entrance to the SH20 Waterview Connection. KiwiRail has reached an agreement with the NZ Transport Agency over a land swap needed for a realignment of the highway and railway corridors.

Another proposal exists to connect the Onehunga Branch at Galway Street to the Avondale—Southdown line by building a tunnel under Onehunga Mall to meet Hugh Watt Drive (State Highway 20) before connecting to the proposed route at Hillsborough.

Study
In May 2007, the Auckland Regional Transport Authority (ARTA) announced that it had formed a study group with ONTRACK to investigate the feasibility and costs for the section between Captain Springs Road in Southdown and Hillsborough Road in Mount Roskill.

See also
 Public transport in Auckland
 List of New Zealand railway lines

References

Proposed railway lines in New Zealand
Public transport in Auckland
Rail transport in Auckland